His Sultanic Highness (HSH) was an honorific of the Sultan of Egypt.

History 
In 1914, as a result of the declaration of war against the Ottoman Empire (of which Egypt was nominally a part), the United Kingdom declared a protectorate over the territory. The British deposed the Egyptian Khedive (Egypt's ruler's title before His Sultanic Highness), replacing him with a family member who was made Sultan of Egypt.

Seven people used this title: Isma'il Fuad, Fawkia Fuad, Faruk I , Fawzia Fuad , Faiza Fuad, Faika Fuad and Fathiya Fuad . 

With the Egyptian Revolution of 1919, the departure of the British from Egypt, and the proclamation of the Kingdom of Egypt in 1922, the country was recognized by the United Kingdom as a sovereign nation. Sultan Fuad I (His Sultanic Highness) was made king of Egypt, with the style of Majesty, and his descendants became Their Royal Highnesses, the princes and princesses of Egypt.

See also

 Sultan
His Highness

References

Royal styles
Sultans of Egypt